Tartaraghan is a small village and civil parish in County Armagh, Northern Ireland. In the 2001 Census it had a population of 90 people. It is within Craigavon Borough Council area. Tartaraghan is also the name of the parish of which the village is part. The name was formerly spelt Taghterraghan and is thought to come . However, the origin Tart Aracháin (meaning "Arachán's spot") has also been put forth.

See also
List of civil parishes of County Armagh

References 

NI Neighbourhood Information System

External links 
Craigavon Historical Society - Tartaraghan Precinct

Villages in County Armagh
Civil parishes of County Armagh